The School of Computer Science (SCS) at Carnegie Mellon University in Pittsburgh, Pennsylvania, US is a school for computer science established in 1988.  It has been consistently ranked among the top computer science programs over the decades. As of 2022 U.S. News & World Report ranks the graduate program as tied for second with Stanford University and University of California, Berkeley. It is ranked second in the United States on Computer Science Open Rankings, which combines scores from multiple independent rankings. 

In the past 15 years, researchers from Carnegie Mellon's School of Computer Science have made developments in the fields of algorithms, artificial intelligence, computer networks, distributed systems, parallel processing, programming languages, computational biology, robotics, language technologies, human–computer interaction and software engineering.

History
In July 1965, Allen Newell, Herbert A. Simon, and Alan J. Perlis, in conjunction with the faculty from the Graduate School of Industrial Administration (GSIA, renamed Tepper School of Business in 2004), staff from the newly formed Computation Center, and key administrators created the Computer Science Department, one of the first such departments in the nation. Their mission statement was "to cultivate a course of study leading to the PhD degree in computer science, a program that would exploit the new technology and assist in establishing a discipline of computer science." The educational program, formally accepted in October 1965, drew its first graduate students from several existing academic disciplines: mathematics, electrical engineering, psychology, and the interdisciplinary Systems and Communications Sciences program in the Graduate School of Industrial Administration. The department was housed within the Mellon College of Science.

With support from Newell, Simon, Nico Haberman, Provost Angel Jordan and President Richard Cyert, the computer science department began a two-year status as a "floating" department in the early months of 1986.  Then, the Department began to grow, both academically and financially. In 1988, the School of Computer Science was established, among the first such schools in the country. The Computer Science Department was the original department within the school.

Structure in the 1970s
During the 1970s the Computer Science Department offered only a PhD study program, with no master's degree as an intermediate step.  The PhD program required a minimum of six years of residency.  It was called the "do or die" program among the graduate students, because a student could not drop a PhD and receive a master's degree.  It had quickly focused on computer networking, operating systems (Hydra, Accent, Mach), and robotics.

SCS today

Organizational units
 Computational Biology Department (CBD)
 Computer Science Department (CSD)
 Human–Computer Interaction Institute (HCII)
 Institute for Software Research (ISR): Its research and education focus is on software systems, which spans not only classical software engineering but also topics such as economics, social and organizational issues, public policy, and privacy. ISR is a distinct entity from the Software Engineering Institute (SEI). SEI is a FFRDC, which is sponsored by the U.S. Department of Defense and does not offer educational programs.
 Language Technologies Institute (LTI)
 Machine Learning Department (MLD)
 Robotics Institute (RI)

Doctoral programs
 PhD in Computational Biology (joint with University of Pittsburgh)
 PhD in Computer Science
 PhD in Computer Science/Dual Degree Portugal
 PhD in Computer Science/Neural Basis of Cognition
 PhD in Human-Computer Interaction
 PhD in Language and Information Technologies
 PhD in Language and Information Technologies/Dual Degree Portugal
 PhD in Machine Learning
 PhD in Machine Learning/Neural Basis of Cognition
 Joint PhD in Statistics & Machine Learning
 PhD in Robotics
 PhD in Robotics/Neural Basis of Cognition
 PhD in Societal Computing
 PhD in Software Engineering
 Joint PhD in Statistics & Machine Learning

Academic masters
 Masters in Computational Biology
 Masters in Computer Science
 Masters in Language Technologies
 Masters in Machine Learning
 Masters in Robotics
 Masters in Robotic Systems Development

Professional masters
 Masters in Product Management (jointly with Tepper)
Masters of Science in Computational Data Science (MCDS)
 Masters of Science in Artificial Intelligence and Innovation (MSAII)
 Master of Science in Music and Technology
 Masters in Biotechnology Innovation and Computation
 Masters in Entertainment Technology
 Masters in Human-Computer Interaction
 Masters in Educational Technology and Applied Learning Science (METALS)
 Masters of Information Technology in Ebusiness Technology
 Masters in Software Engineering
 Masters in Software Engineering Management
 MBA Track in Technology Leadership (joint SCS/Tepper program)
 Master of Science in Information Technology in Robotics Technology (MSIT/RT)
 Master of Science in Information Technology—Privacy Engineering (MSIT-PE)
 Masters of Science in Information Technology—Embedded Software Engineering
 Masters of Science in Information Technology—Software Engineering
 Master in Business Administration/Master of Software Engineering
 Master in Intelligent Information Systems (MIIS)

Undergraduate programs
 Bachelor of Computer Science and Arts
 Bachelor of Science in Computational Biology
 Bachelor of Science in Computer Science
 Bachelor of Science in Artificial Intelligence
 Bachelor of Science in Human-Computer Interaction
 Bachelor of Science in Music and Technology
 Minor in Computer Science
 Minor in Language Technologies
 Minor in Robotics
 Minor in Software Engineering
 Minor in Neural Computation
 Minor in Human-Computer Interaction
 Minor in Machine Learning
 Minor in Computational Biology
 Additional Major in Computer Science
 Additional Major in Robotics
 Additional Major in Human-Computer Interaction
 Fifth Year Masters in Computer Science (Carnegie Mellon, CS undergrads only)
 MBA – Computer Science 3-2 Program (Carnegie Mellon, CS undergrads only)

Student organizations
Women@SCS is an educational program at Carnegie Mellon whose mission is to create, encourage, and support women's academic, social and professional opportunities in the computer sciences and to promote the breadth of the field and its diverse community.  Women@SCS has initiated programs, such as the Big/Little Sister program for undergraduates, the invited Speaker Series for graduates, as well as dinners and other social and academic events. Women@SCS also sponsors outreach projects such as "Is there a robot in your future?" workshop for middle school girls. In general, the committee strives to promote a healthy and supportive community atmosphere.

SCS4ALL is an umbrella organization at Carnegie Mellon that promotes diversity in the School of Computer Science and coordinates outreach programs to broaden interest, understanding, and diversity in computing. SCS4ALL shares many of the core goals of Women@SCS and has expanded to develop more inclusive programs. Within SCS, the organization works to develop social and professional activities and leadership opportunities, such as the social trivia night, the "Develop Your Elevator Pitch" event, panel discussions with industry leaders, and the annual celebration of diversity SCS Day. In outreach, the organization organizes interactive presentations about computer science at local elementary, middle, and high schools. SCS4ALL is open to all students in the SCS and seeks to involve all communities in SCS in shaping the organization and its events.

Gates and Hillman Centers 

The Gates Center for Computer Science and the Hillman Center for Future-Generation Technologies are home to much of the School of Computer Science. The $98 million complex was opened in 2009.
It has  of floor space, including about 310 offices, 11 conference rooms, 32 labs,  of project space and the Planetary Robotics Center. It also houses 12 classrooms, including a 250-seat auditorium.

Additionally, the Gates Center connects to the Purnell Center, which houses the School of Drama, via the Randy Pausch Memorial Footbridge. The bridge represents Professor Pausch's own devotion to linking computer science and entertainment, as he was a co-founder of Carnegie Mellon's Entertainment Technology Center.

Mack Scogin Merril Elam Architects of Atlanta, Georgia were the lead architects. The Gates and Hillman Centers have received LEED Gold Certification.

Traditions 

 Carnegie Mellon's Mobot Races, now in their 14th year, are hosted by the School of Computer Science during every Spring Carnival celebration. The Mobots (short for mobile robots) follow a slalom course painted in the sidewalk outside of Wean Hall. The Mobot Races used to include a MoboJoust competition, but it has not been held since 2002 to avoid damaging the Mobots.
 SCS Day is a yearly celebration of computer science that started in 2003. The event features a variety of activities, including exhibits, workshops and games, in addition to an evening talent show.

Smiley face 

SCS research professor Scott Fahlman is credited with the invention of the smiley face emoticon. He suggested the emoticon on an electronic board in 1982 as a way for board readers to know when an author was joking. The text of Fahlman's original post was lost for nearly 20 years but was later recovered from backup tapes:

Tartan Racing 

Tartan Racing is a collaboration between Carnegie Mellon and General Motors Corporation that competes in the DARPA Grand Challenge. The Grand Challenge is a competition for driverless cars sponsored by Defense Advanced Research Projects Agency (DARPA). Tartan Racing is led by Carnegie Mellon roboticist William L. "Red" Whittaker.

In 2007, Tartan Racing won the DARPA Urban Challenge, in which 11 autonomous ground vehicles raced over urban roadways. In the challenge, team vehicles were required to obey all California driving laws, share the road with other drivers and robotic cars, and complete the course in under six hours. Tartan Racing won the $2 million cash prize with Boss, a reworked 2007 Chevy Tahoe. Averaging about  an hour for a  trip, Boss beat the second-place team, Stanford Racing, by just under 20 minutes.

SCS honors and awards

The School established a number of honors and awards.

 SCS Endowed Chairs
 Finmeccanica Chair
 A. Nico Habermann Chair in the School of Computer Science
 Litton Faculty Fellows
 Allen Newell Award for Research Excellence
 Herbert A. Simon Award for Teaching Excellence in Computer Science
 The Robert Doherty Prize for Excellence in Education
 Carnegie Mellon University Undergraduate Academic Advising Award

Faculty 

Faculty members from the School of Computer Science have received international recognition for achievements within their fields. These honors include memberships and fellowships in the National Academy of Sciences, the National Academy of Engineering, the American Association for the Advancement of Science, the Association for Computing Machinery, the Institute for Electrical and Electronic Engineers and The Alfred P. Sloan Foundation. Twelve SCS faculty and alumni have won the A. M. Turing Award, the Association for Computing Machinery's most prestigious award, often called the "Nobel Prize of computing." These include Raj Reddy, Manuel Blum and Edmund M. Clarke of the active faculty, in addition to Emeritus Faculty Dana Scott.

Notable faculty 

 Randy Pausch was a professor of computer science, human-computer interaction and design. Pausch was also a best-selling author, who became known around the world after he gave "The Last Lecture" speech on September 18, 2007 at Carnegie Mellon. Pausch was instrumental in the development of Alice, a computer teaching tool. He also co-founded Carnegie Mellon's Entertainment Technology Center. Randy Pausch died on July 25, 2008.
 Mary Shaw is the Alan J. Perlis Professor of Computer Science in the Institute for Software Research at Carnegie Mellon University. Shaw published seminal work on software engineering, and has lately become well known for her work on computer science education. Shaw was awarded the National Medal of Technology and Innovation on November 21, 2014.
 Luis von Ahn is a Consulting Professor in the Computer Science Department, where he also received his PhD in 2005. Von Ahn was named a MacArthur Fellow in 2006 (called the "genius" grant). He also created Games With a Purpose, a website where users can play games to help train computers to solve complicated problems, in addition to reCAPTCHA and Duolingo.
 William L. "Red" Whittaker is a roboticist and research professor of robotics at Carnegie Mellon who led the Tartan Racing team to victory in the 2007 DARPA Grand Challenge. He is also leading a team of Carnegie Mellon students to win the Google Lunar X Prize. Whittaker is the Fredkin Professor of Robotics at the Robotics Institute and the director of the Robotics Institute's Field Robotics Center since its creation in 1983.  Whittaker earned his master's and doctoral degrees in Civil Engineering from Carnegie Mellon in the late 1970s.
Raj Reddy is the University Professor of Computer Science and Robotics and Moza Bint Nasser Chair at the School of Computer Science at Carnegie Mellon University. His areas of interest include artificial intelligence and human-computer interaction. He received the ACM Turning award in 1994. He received the French Legion of Honour in 1984 and Padma Bhushan award in 2001. He was also awarded the Honda Prize in 2005, and the Vannevar Bush Award in 2006. Reddy was the founding directory of the Robotics Institute and the Dean of School of Computer Science. He was one of the founders of the American Association for Artificial Intelligence and was its President from 1987 to 1989.
 Takeo Kanade is a U.A. and Helen Whitaker University Professor of Computer Science and Robotics. He is the director of the Quality of Life Technology Engineering Research Center at Carnegie Mellon. His main areas of interest include computer vision, multi-media, manipulators, autonomous mobile robots, and sensors.
 Hans Moravec is a research professor at the Robotics Institute with interests in mobile robots and artificial intelligence. He worked in the RI's Mobile Robot Lab, a research space designed to produce robots able to move through intricate indoor and outdoor areas. He also helped develop Moravec's paradox in the 1980s, which states that it is more difficult for computers to learn basic human instincts than human reason.
 Manuela M. Veloso is the Herbert A. Simon Professor at the School of Computer Science, Carnegie Mellon University. She is the President of the International RoboCup Federation that she co-founded and the President Elect of the Association for the Advancement of Artificial Intelligence. She is a fellow of the American Association for Artificial Intelligence, a fellow of the American Association for the Advancement of Science, and a Fellow of IEEE.  Her research focus on the scientific and engineering challenges of creating teams of intelligent agents in complex, dynamic, and uncertain environments, in particular adversarial environments, such as robot soccer, that Cooperate, Observe the world, Reason, Act, and Learn. She currently researches and develops effective indoor mobile service robots aiming at contributing to a multi-robot, multi-human symbiotic relationship, in which robots and humans coordinate and cooperate as a function of their limitations and strengths.
 Manuel Blum is the Bruce Nelson Professor of Computer Science and a Turing Award winner. His wife Lenore Blum and son Avrim Blum are also professors in the School of Computer Science.
 Lorrie Cranor is the FORE Systems Professor in the Institute for Software Research and served as the Chief Technologist at the Federal Trade Commission.
 Kathleen Carley is a computational social scientist and a professor at the Institute for Software Research.
 David Garlan is a professor at the Institute for Software Research.
 Randal Bryant is a professor at the Institute for Software Research.
 Daniel Siewiorek is the Buhl University Professor Emeritus at CMU.
 Michael Ian Shamos is a Distinguished Career Professor in the Institute for Systems Research and Language Technologies Institute.

See also
Robotics Institute
Software Engineering Institute
Language Technologies Institute
Human-Computer Interaction Institute

References

Further reading

External links

 
SCS on Twitter

Schools and departments of Carnegie Mellon
Computer science departments in the United States
Educational institutions established in 1965
1965 establishments in Pennsylvania